The Party for the Commonwealth of Canada fielded several candidates in the 1993 federal election, none of whom were elected.  Information about these candidates may be found here.  The PCC was the political wing of Lyndon LaRouche's movement in Canada.

List of Candidates (incomplete)

Quebec

Ontario

St. Paul's: Mike Twose

Twose described himself as an electrician.  He campaigned against Canada's involvement in the North American Free Trade Agreement, the General Agreement on Tariffs and Trade and related agreements (Toronto Star, 22 October 1993).  He received 11 votes (0.02%), finishing twelfth against Liberal Barry Campbell.

In 2002, Twose wrote against the existing system of peer review for scientific grants and publications (Toronto Star, 2 October 2002).

British Columbia

Vancouver Centre: Lucylle Boikoff

Boikoff's first name is sometimes spelled as "Lucille".  She campaigned for public office several times, and was described as a 64-year-old retired teacher in 1990.  She accused the International Monetary Fund of complicity with genocide in 1985.

References